Hougland is a surname. Notable people with the surname include:

Bill Hougland (1930–2017), American basketball player
Jeff Hougland (born 1978), American mixed martial artist
Whayne M. Hougland Jr., American bishop